Renupoma Rajkhowa (born 1 July 1955) is an Asom Gana Parishad politician from Assam, India. She was elected into the Assam Legislative Assembly election in 1991, 1996 2016 from Teok constituency. She is the wife of Lalit Chandra Rajkhowa who she succeeded as the Member of the Assam Legislative Assembly from the Teok constituency in 1991. She was also Deputy Speaker of Assam Legislative Assembly.

References 

Living people
Asom Gana Parishad politicians
People from Jorhat district
Assam MLAs 1991–1996
Assam MLAs 1996–2001
Assam MLAs 2016–2021
Assam MLAs 2021–2026
1955 births